Yiwen may refer to:

 The Crown Prince Yiwen, a posthumous name of Zhu Biao of the Ming dynasty
 The Yiwen Leiju, a medieval Chinese encyclopedia
 Wu Yiwen, a Chinese swimmer